The Sharjah Mosque, is the largest mosque in the Emirate of Sharjah, the United Arab Emirates.
 
The construction of the mosque was commissioned by the Government of Sharjah.

The mosque was officially opened in a ceremony in which HH Sultan Bin Muhammed Al Qassim (Ruler of Sharjah) opened the doors of the mosque for the general public.

The mosque also consist of library in the besides area for the main purpose to give Dawah to The non-muslims as well as muslims.

History

Construction began in 2014, costing around 300 million dirhams. It was inaugurated on 10 May 2019 by Ruler of Sharjah, Shaikh Sultan bin Muhammad Al-Qasimi.

Two coins, one gold and one silver, each inscribed with a verse from the Quran, were issued by the Central Bank of the United Arab Emirates, and designed by the Sharjah Islamic Bank, to commemorate the occasion.

Geography, dimensions and statistics

It is located in the area of Tay, at the junction of the Emirates Road and the road to Mleiha. To compare, the King Faisal Mosque, formerly the largest mosque in the Emirate and country, measures . The Sharjah Mosque is open to non-Muslim visitors, with dedicated spaces and pathways defined for them. The mosque is home to a large library that has many original Islamic works. Over 2,200 cars and buses can be parked in the different parking lots of the mosque complex. A rubber track goes around the mosque for visitors who wish to go for a walk around the complex. It also has a souvenir shop, museum and fountains. It is equipped with two ablution areas, and 100 wheelchairs for the elderly.

It can accommodate up to 25,000 worshipers, with an inside capacity of over 5,000 people, 610 of whom can be women. The front hall and side lobbies have a capacity of more than 6,000 worshipers, while the outdoor area can accommodate 13,500.

See also
 List of mosques in the United Arab Emirates
 Timeline of Islamic history
 Sheikh Zayed Mosque
 Sultan Qaboos Grand Mosque

References

External links

 Inside the Sharjah Mosque: The Emirate's Largest Mosque, Khaleej Times (Facebook)
 Devotees offer Eid prayer at Sharjah mosque
 An Inside Look at the New Sharjah Mosque Bayut.com (YouTube)

2019 establishments in the United Arab Emirates
Mosques completed in 2019
Mosques in Sharjah (city)
21st-century mosques
Mosque buildings with domes